The 1996 United States presidential election in Colorado took place on November 7, 1996, as part of the 1996 United States presidential election. Voters chose eight representatives, or electors to the Electoral College, who voted for president and vice president.

Colorado was narrowly won by Republican Senator Bob Dole of Kansas over incumbent Democratic President Bill Clinton of Arkansas. Dole won with a plurality of 45.80% of the vote to Clinton's 44.43%, a margin of 1.37%. Billionaire businessman Ross Perot of Texas, running as the Reform Party nominee, finished third, with 6.59% of the popular vote.

Dole, from neighboring Kansas, performed most strongly in the eastern parts of Colorado bordering his home state. Clinton won Denver by 31.8%, about the same as his 31.4% margin in the city in 1992. He also won Boulder County, which had been a historically Republican county before voting for Dukakis in 1988, by a commanding margin of 17.6%, although this was down somewhat from his 24.4% margin in the county in 1992. He won the traditionally Democratic Denver-area suburban county of Adams County by 12.4%, a larger margin than Humphrey, Carter, or Dukakis had scored in the county, but, again, down from his own 14.1% margin in 1992. Clinton also retained a number of smaller counties that he had won for the Democrats for the first time since 1964--Clear Creek, Eagle, Gunnison, Routt, and Summit-and did well in the traditionally Democratic counties in the southern parts of the state.

However, aside from slightly narrowing Clinton's margins in Boulder and Adams Counties, Dole improved substantially on George H. W. Bush's 1992 margins in the large, then-traditionally Republican Denver-area suburban counties of Jefferson and Arapahoe, winning them by 5.7% and 8.9%, respectively (Bush had won them in 1992 by 0.9% and 3.1%, respectively). He also won conservative stronghold El Paso County, home to Colorado Springs, by a commanding margin of 26.8%, an improvement over Bush's 1992 margin of 23.7%. And he flipped sizeable Larimer County, home to Fort Collins, which had been the largest county in the state that Clinton won for the Democrats for the first time since 1964 in 1992. He also flipped smaller Garfield and La Plata Counties, and won the two counties Perot had won a plurality in 1992, Moffat and San Juan.

Dole's slim victory made Colorado one of three states (along with Georgia and Montana) to flip against Clinton from 1992 to 1996, even as Clinton increased his national margin of victory by nearly 3 points. , this was the last time since 1960 that Colorado and Nevada voted for different candidates, and the last time to date that Colorado has backed a losing Republican candidate.

This is also the last election in which Mineral County, Otero County, and Bent County voted for a Democratic presidential candidate. Colorado was one of only two states which Bill Clinton lost in either of his elections but his wife Hillary Clinton won in 2016; the other being Virginia. Clinton is the only democratic president to lose Colorado in his second election bid despite winning the state in his first, (although FDR lost Colorado in his third and fourth elections, after winning the state in his first two). This marks the last time that Colorado voted against an incumbent president who was successfully re-elected. 

Dole’s victory was the first of three consecutive Republican victories in the state, as Colorado would not vote Democratic again until Barack Obama in 2008, after which it became a Democratic stronghold.

Results

Results by county

References

Colorado
1996
1996 Colorado elections